The 2018 Winter Olympics in Pyeongchang are televised by a number of broadcasters throughout the world. As with previous years, Olympic Broadcasting Services together with Japan's NHK produces the world feed provided to local broadcasters for use in their coverage, including about 90 hours of content captured in 8K.

The Games are broadcast in ultra-high resolution and high dynamic range in select markets. In South Korea, terrestrial UHD broadcasts employ ATSC 3.0 standard, launched on May 31, 2017, by SBS, MBC, and KBS in major South Korean markets such as Seoul and Incheon. In the United States UHD broadcasts are available to cable subscribers of NBCUniversal, and to subscribers of satellite TV providers DirecTV and Dish Network.

Broadcasters
On 29 June 2015, the IOC announced that Discovery Communications—owner of Eurosport, had acquired exclusive rights to the Olympics from 2018 through 2024 across Europe, excluding Russia, on all platforms. Discovery will sub-license its broadcast rights to local free-to-air networks on a territorial basis. Discovery's rights deal will, initially, not cover France due to pre-existing rights deals with France Télévisions that run through the 2020 Games. Unlike previous pan-European deals, such as with the European Broadcasting Union and Sportfive, Discovery will not solely serve as a reseller, and intends to carry coverage on its regional properties, but has committed to sub-licensing at least 100 hours of coverage to free-to-air networks. In the United Kingdom, Discovery will sub-license exclusive pay television rights from the BBC (which still holds broadcast rights through 2020), in exchange for sub-licensing free-to-air rights to the 2022 and 2024 Olympics from Discovery.

In addition, IMG was awarded the in-flight/in-ships broadcast rights. The Olympic Channel will broadcast the Games across the Indian subcontinent.

Notes

References

2018 Winter Olympics broadcasters
Broadcasters